Samuel "Sam" Houston (March 2, 1793 – July 26, 1863) represented the state of Tennessee in the United States House of Representatives, and was elected Governor of Tennessee. He resigned the governorship in 1829 and lived with the Cherokee in the Arkansas Territory. The Cherokee named him "Golanv" meaning "The Raven". In 1832 he moved to Coahuila y Tejas and was a signer of the Texas Declaration of Independence on March 2, 1836.  Houston was appointed commander-in-chief of the Provisional Army of Texas, and accepted the surrender of Mexican general Antonio López de Santa Anna following the Battle of San Jacinto. 

Twice elected as President of the Republic of Texas, Houston eventually favored annexation to the United States. Afterwards he represented Texas in the United States Senate and was elected the 7th Governor of Texas. When the state seceded from the Union on March 5, 1861, Houston refused to sign a loyalty oath to the Confederate States of America and was removed from office on March 16.

Bibliography

References

External links

Bibliographies of people
History of Tennessee
History of Texas
History of Virginia
Sam Houston